Sir Herbert Stanley Marchant KCMG OBE (18 May 1906 – 8 August 1990) was a schoolmaster, at Bletchley Park the codebreaking centre in World War II, and then a diplomat. He was ambassador to Cuba (1960–63) and Tunisia (1963–66); remembered for replying to British newspapers during the Cuban Missile Crisis that “Everything is perfectly quiet here” (in Cuba).

Marchant was born in Cambridge and attended Perse School, before studying modern languages at St John’s College, Cambridge. He was an assistant master at Harrow School 1928–39, teaching French and German, and later Russian.

He was at Bletchley Park in World War II, where he was the deputy head of Hut 3 from 1943 until the end of the war. The head Eric Jones had taken over sole responsibility from 1942, after personal rivalries between the original staff of Hut 3.

After the war he was in the Foreign Service 1946–66. Then he became Assistant Director of the Institute of Race Relations 1966–68, and United Kingdom representative on the United Nations Committee for the Elimination of Racial Discrimination 1969–73.

He married Diana Selway in 1937, they had one son. He was awarded the OBE 1946, CMG 1957 & KCMG 1963.

Books by H.S. Marchant
Scratch a Russian (Drummond, London, 1937) Travel in the Soviet Union  
His Excellency Regrets (Kimber, London, 1980) a novel

References

Obituary in The Times, London of 13 August 1990 page 12. 
Secret Days: Code-breaking in Bletchley Park by Asa Briggs (2011, Frontline Books, London)  
Who’s Who 2013 (London)

1906 births
1990 deaths
Bletchley Park people
Members of the Committee on the Elimination of Racial Discrimination
Ambassadors of the United Kingdom to Tunisia
Ambassadors of the United Kingdom to Cuba
Alumni of St John's College, Cambridge
People educated at The Perse School
Schoolteachers from Cambridgeshire
English travel writers
Writers about the Soviet Union
British officials of the United Nations
Knights Commander of the Order of St Michael and St George
Officers of the Order of the British Empire
Teachers at Harrow School